The Austin-Healey Sebring Sprite is a small sports car that was produced by the Donald Healey Motor Company at its Cape Works in Warwick and at the Healey's Speed Equipment Division in Grosvenor Street, London W1. Subsequently Sebring Sprites were also produced by John Sprinzel Ltd from his well-known premises in Lancaster Mews, W2. 

A modified version of the production Austin-Healey Sprite, it was recognized by the governing body of motorsport, the Fédération Internationale de l'Automobile, as a separate model in its own right, featuring Girling disc brakes as well as specified engine and chassis improvements. After its homologation (motorsport) on 17 September 1960, FIA regulations permitted the use of 'special bodies' and a small number of Sebring Sprites were subsequently fitted with coupé bodywork in aluminium alloy and glassfibre, the most strikingly attractive examples being those devised by well-known race and rally driver John Sprinzel, who had won the 1959 RAC British Rally Championship. Sprinzel commissioned the coachbuilders Williams & Pritchard, renowned for their racing and prototype work, to produce the bodies. These are usually said to have numbered six, but in fact eight are now known to have been made. Further Sprites received similar alloy bodywork from Alec Goldie and Fred Faulkner of the firm Robert Peel Sheet Metal Works (more usually known as 'Peel Coachworks'). The name 'Sebring Sprite' would become a generic term for any Sprite with disc brakes, and later for any Sprite with coupé or fastback bodywork.

(Please note the adjacent picture shows a modern replica Sprinzel Sebring Sprite, as produced by Brian Archer, but fitted with a replica of the Speedwell GT bonnet designed by Frank Costin)

Class domination at the 1959 Twelve Hours of Sebring 

For the celebrated long-distance race at Sebring, Florida, in March 1959, the BMC Competition Department entered three Austin-Healey Sprites in the 12 Hours Grand Prix d'Endurance. The cars were prepared by Donald's son Geoffrey Healey at the company's Cape Works in Warwick, and were fitted with a prototype Dunlop disc brake on all four wheels as well as wire wheels (and tyres) from the same company. Larger twin 1-inch SU carburettors gave the engines more performance and special twin-plate racing clutches took the drive to straight-cut close-ratio gearboxes. The cars were raced by Hugh Sutherland, Phil Stiles, Ed Leavens, Dr Harold Kunz, Fred Hayes, John Christy and John Colgate Jnr. Despite setbacks, the Sprites managed to finish first, second and third in their class, and their success in this premier sportscar race, which was part of FIA World Sportscar Championship, gave valuable publicity to BMC in the important North American market.

Healey Sebring Sprites 

The Healeys subsequently offered to equip customers' Sprites to a similar specification to the Sebring cars, though using twin 1-inch SU H4 carburettors and a complete replacement braking system by Girling. This comprised 8-inch 'Type 9' calliper discs for the front wheels and 8-inch drums at the rear, with all brake lines, unions, flexibles and fluid being replaced with Girling equipment. One such Sprite (registered 888 HPA) was owned, tuned and raced by Beatrice Shilling, the aeronautical engineer now hailed a Second World War hero for making a small but life-saving improvement to the Rolls-Royce Merlin engines fitted to both the RAF's Hurricane and Spitfire fighter aircraft. These Healey Sebring Sprites were modified at The Cape Works, and from early 1960 also at the small workshop at the London showrooms in Grosvenor Street, where the Healey Speed Equipment Division was run by the then reigning British Rally Champion, John Sprinzel and the chief mechanic was future F1 driver Paul Hawkins.

In 1957, John Sprinzel had founded the highly successful tuning firm Speedwell Performance Conversions Ltd, where he was joined by future Formula 1 World Champion Graham Hill. Speedwell developed a sleek, alloy-bodied Sprite coupe, the Speedwell GT, designed by aerodynamicist Frank Costin and built by Williams & Pritchard. However, in early 1960, Donald Healey managed to lure John Sprinzel away from Speedwell by inviting him to set up the Healey Speed Equipment Division at Grosvenor Street, with the added incentive of Healey works drives at both Sebring and Le Mans.

Sebring 1960 

Because of increasing safety worries about the speed differential between the smallest and largest-engined cars, a separate four-hour race for GT cars of under one litre was organized at Sebring in 1960. Stirling Moss drove a Sebring Sprite to a class win and second overall in this event. In the twelve-hour race, John Sprinzel drove a prototype Sprite with a GRP Falcon kit-car body, built and entered by the Donald Healey Motor Company, to another impressive class win, finishing 41st overall.

Sprinzel Sebring Sprites 

Leaving the Healeys to set up his own tuning and race preparation concern at Lancaster Mews in December 1960, John Sprinzel launched his Williams & Pritchard-bodied coupe to immediate acclaim at the Racing Car Show in London. Sprinzel Sebring Sprites were soon being built for racers Cyril Simson (S 221), Chris Williams (52 LPH), Ian Walker (WJB 707), Andrew Hedges (410 EAO) and for BMC works rally driver David Seigle-Morris (D 20). Sprinzel's personal Sebring Sprite bore the registration number PMO 200, and he campaigned the car at Sebring and in international rallies as well as races throughout the 1961 season, culminating in an outright win in the Targa Rusticana rally at the beginning of 1962.

Sebring 1961 

No less than 7 Sebring Sprites contested the long-distance races at Sebring in 1961. Five Healey-prepared BMC works cars were driven by Ed Leavens, Briggs Cunningham, Dick Thompson, Bruce McLaren and Walt Hansgen. There were also two of John Sprinzel's striking coupes, piloted by one of the top-rated Grand Prix drivers of all time, Stirling Moss, together with his sister Pat Moss, Britain's most successful woman rally driver. The Sebring Sprites finished in six of the top eight places in the 4-hour race for one-litre homologated GT cars. In the 12-hour race, Sebring Sprites were driven by Ed Leavens, John Colgate, Joe Buzetta, Glenn Carlson, Cyril Simson and future F1 driver Paul Hawkins to strong performances, finishing 2nd, 3rd and 4th in the 1150cc sports (prototype) class and 15th and 25th and 37th overall.

Later Sebring Sprites 

Over the years, the cars were sold to privateers who raced and rallied them. In later years, the Sebring Sprite became a prized possession and the object of veneration within the Austin-Healey fraternity. Enthusiasts sought out the cars, sometimes discovering them in advanced stages of deterioration. Today, the cars are cherished classics that can be driven to and from competitions just like the originals were in their day. Subsequently, numbers of other Sprites were modified as period replicas of the original Speedwell GTs and Sprinzel Sebring Sprites, built to the same homologated specification.

One such car is the "Lumbertubs" Sprite, built in 1963 by brothers Brian and Ken Myers and named for the lane they lived on. The alloy roof was crafted by Alan Thompson of Aston Martin and a fibreglass Williams & Pritchard Sprinzel Sebring bonnet was fitted. It later acquired a Ford engine and gearbox, gaining some success in sprints and hillclimbs and a class win at Silverstone on 24 June 1967.

References 

 John Sprinzel's Austin-Healey Sebring Sprite Coupés

Sebring Sprite
Coupés
Rally cars
Sports cars
Grand tourer racing cars
Cars introduced in 1959
1960s cars